Zlocha (Slovak feminine: Zlochová) is a surname. Notable people with the surname include:

 Ján Zlocha (1942–2013), Slovak football player
 Ľudovít Zlocha (born 1945), Slovak football player

See also
 

Slovak-language surnames